Dave Darling, (born in 1958 in San Francisco CA), is an American record producer, songwriter, mixer, and multi-instrumentalist. He relocated to Los Angeles, California in 1980 while recording an album project and decided to stay in Los Angeles to pursue a career in music.  Darling has worked with many successful recording artists such as The Temptations, Glen Campbell, The Brian Setzer Orchestra, Stray Cats, Ricky Lee Jones, Rusty Young, John Waite, Def Leppard, Tom Waits, Janiva Magness, Jack Johnson, Cherie Currie, Brie Howard and more.  He has produced six Grammy nominated records. In addition to being a record producer, Darling, has been a member of several bands, most notably Boxing Gandhis and 58.

Professional Music Career

Brian Setzer
Darling has produced and mixed ten albums with Brian Setzer, The Brian Setzer Orchestra, and The Stray Cats, five of which were nominated for Grammy Awards.  Setzer Goes Instru-Mental! won a Grammy Award for Best Contemporary album in 2011. Darling appeared in the video documentary, Stray Cats: Rumble in Brixton in 2004 and It's a Rockabilly World! documentary in 2016.

Janiva Magness
Darling has produced six records for singer, Janiva Magness.  Her 2016 release, Love Wins Again, (co-written and produced by Darling) was nominated for a Grammy Award for Best Contemporary Blues Album. The album debuted at number 5 on the Billboard Blues Chart, number 2 on iTunes Blues, reached number 1 on the Blues radio chart, and spent two months on the Americana radio chart.  Their collaborative, I Won't Cry won Song of the Year at the Blues Music Awards in 2013.
.

Boxing Gandhis
Darling is the founder of Boxing Gandhis which was signed to the record label Mesa Blue Moon in 1993. The band has recorded four albums. They climbed the charts with a #5 hit on the Billboard Triple A (Adult Album Alternative) charts with the song, If You Love Me (Why Am I Dyin') off their debut album after touring the US as opening act for the Dave Matthews Band and Big Head Todd and the Monsters. The song's music video also garnered a Billboard Music Award for "Video of the Year" which was directed by Brian Lockwood (director). If You Love Me (Why Am I Dyin') was featured in Episode 3 of the 2011 season of the HBO Original Series True Blood.

Boxing Gandhis (1994, Mesa Records)
Howard (1996, Atlantic Records)
Culture War (2019, Blue Elan Records)

58
58 was an eclectic, alternative, pop-rock band foursome that included Darling, Nikki Sixx, Steve Gibb and Bucket Baker. They released, Diet For A New America on May 16, 2000 on Sixx's record label, Americoma. All songs were written by Nikki Sixx and Dave Darling, except Alone Again (Naturally) written by Gilbert O'Sullivan and "Who We Are" written by Nikki Sixx, Dave Darling and Steve Gibb.

Film, Television, and Commercials
Darling's music and/or production has been placed in films, TV shows, and commercials such as True Blood, So You Think You Can Dance, Ed TV, Father of the Bride, What a Girl Wants, Entourage, Chuck, Bad Girls Club, Ugly Betty, Ritz Crackers, and Lincoln Navigator.

Discography

References

1958 births
Record producers from California
Living people
Businesspeople from San Francisco